Joseph E. Meyer (born April 2, 1949) is an American professional basketball coach and former men's college basketball coach. He was the head coach of the Fort Wayne Mad Ants, the Indiana Pacers' affiliate in the NBA Development League. He is currently the circuit's all-time victories leader. He was previously the head basketball coach of the DePaul Blue Demons from 1984 to 1997. He currently provides color commentary on radio broadcasts of Northwestern University Men's Basketball games on WGN-AM in Chicago.

DePaul Blue Demons 
Meyer was an assistant coach at DePaul for eleven seasons under his father, Ray Meyer. Ray Meyer coached DePaul from 1942 to 1984, winning 724 games and leading the Blue Demons to winning records in 37 of his 42 seasons., including seven NCAA men's basketball tournament appearances in his last nine seasons. When Ray Meyer retired in 1984, Joey Meyer was promoted to head coach.

Joey Meyer led DePaul to seven NCAA Tournament appearances in his first eight seasons, including back-to-back Sweet Sixteen appearances in his second and third seasons. In the 1986 tournament, #12-seeded DePaul—led by freshman guard Rod Strickland (14.1 ppg season average) and junior Dallas Comegys (13.8 ppg) -- upset #5-seeded Virginia and #4-seeded Oklahoma in the East regional before losing to top-seeded Duke 74-67. In 1987, the Blue Demons—again led by Comegys (17.5 ppg) and Strickland (16.3 ppg) -- finished the regular season 26-2 and received a #3 seed in the Midwest regional of the 1987 tournament. They defeated #14-seeded Louisiana Tech and #6-seeded St. John's before losing to #10-seeded LSU. Meyer was honored as the Chevrolet Coach of the Year in 1987. Besides seven NCAA tournament appearances, Meyer led the Blue Demons to three appearances in the National Invitation Tournament.

In both 1988 and 1989, DePaul reached the second round of the NCAA tournament, but they were on a downward trajectory. In 1992, the Blue Demons were co-champions of the newly formed Great Midwest Conference but made their last NCAA tournament appearance under Meyer. The Blue Demons went into free fall in Meyer's final two campaigns at DePaul. An 11–18 finish in 1996 which was the first losing season since 1971 was followed by a 13-game losing streak to end a program-worst 3–23 in 1997. Meyer was fired on April 28, 1997 and replaced by Pat Kennedy  months later on June 12.

American Basketball Association 
Meyer began his professional basketball head coaching career with the Chicago Skyliners of the American Basketball Association, leading them to a 29-11 record and the Western Conference championship in 2000-01. The Skyliners lost the championship game to the Detroit Dogs 107-91.

NBA Development League 
In 2001, he joined the NBA D-League with the Asheville Altitude, winning back-to-back league championships in 2004 and 2005. After the franchise moved to Tulsa, Oklahoma following its second title, Meyer continued to coach the team through the 2007-08 campaign. He was named the head coach of the Fort Wayne Mad Ants on June 3, 2009. During his first two seasons with the Mad Ants, the ballclub went 22–28 in 2009–10 and 24–26 in 2010–11. The team's 5–10 start to the 2011–12 campaign led to his dismissal on January 6, 2012.

His son Brian was a National Basketball Association (NBA) scout with the Chicago Bulls.

Head coaching record

References 

1949 births
Living people
American men's basketball coaches
American men's basketball players
Asheville Altitude coaches
Basketball coaches from Illinois
Basketball players from Illinois
Buffalo Braves draft picks
DePaul Blue Demons men's basketball coaches
DePaul Blue Demons men's basketball players
Fort Wayne Mad Ants coaches
Tulsa 66ers coaches